Rossana Martini  (1 January 1926 – 2 February 1988) was an Italian actress, model and beauty pageant titleholder.

Born in Empoli, at 20 Martini won the first edition of the Miss Italia beauty contest held in 1946, raising a great controversy by the tabloid press for the non-election of Silvana Pampanini. She subsequently started a career as an actress, sometimes starring leading roles. She was married to the actor and producer Nino Crisman.

Selected filmography
 At the Edge of the City (1953)
 La vita agra (1964)

References

External links 

1926 births
1988 deaths
People from Empoli
Italian beauty pageant winners
Italian film actresses
Italian female models
20th-century Italian actresses